Spyro Gyra is the debut album by the jazz fusion group Spyro Gyra, released in 1978. The album was self-released on the label Crosseyed Bear Productions before the band signed with Amherst Records and re-released it with a different cover.

At Billboard magazine, the album reached No. 99 on the Top 200 Albums chart and also No. 99 in Canada. "Shaker Song" reached No. 16 on the Adult Contemporary singles chart, No. 90 on the Hot 100 singles chart, and was covered by the Manhattan Transfer on the album Extensions. In Canada, "Shaker Song" made No. 99 in the Top 100 chart, and No. 26 in the AO chart.

Track listing

Personnel
Band
 Jay Beckenstein – alto saxophone, soprano saxophone, tenor saxophone, percussion, arrangements
 Jeremy Wall – acoustic piano, Fender Rhodes, Minimoog, ARP Odyssey, ARP String Ensemble, Hammond organ, percussion, arrangements
 Jim Kurzdorfer – bass guitar
 Tom Walsh – drums, percussion
 Umbopha Emile Latimer – congas, percussion

Guests
 Tom Schuman – Minimoog (7), acoustic piano (8), Fender Rhodes (8)
  Greg Millar – electric guitar (1, 2, 5, 7)
 Freddy Rapillo – electric guitar (3, 4, 6, 8, 9)
 Rubens Bassini – congas (1, 5, 6)
 Dave Samuels – marimba (1, 4), tabla (1, 4)
 Rick Bell – trombone (2)
 Fred Marshall – trombone (6)
 Anthony Gorruso – trumpet (6)

Production 
 Jay Beckenstein – producer 
 Richard Calandra – producer
 Jeremy Wall – assistant producer
 Chuck Madden – engineer 
 Craig Bishop – mixing 
 Larry Swist – mixing 
 Jim Bonnefond – mix assistant 
 Rusty Payne – editing
 Michael Cobb – cover design

References

1978 debut albums
Spyro Gyra albums